Yamyam (born Abdulkadir Hersi Siyad, 4 September 1946 – October 22, 2005) or Yam Yam was a Somali poet and playwright. Yamyam was one of the main contributors for the Somali National Academy of Culture (SNAC), also known as the Somali National Academy of Arts, Sciences and Literature. He was active as a poet from the 1960s.

There is no one consistent English translation of his name. Alternative spellings include Cabdulqaadir or Cabdilqaadir Xirsi.

Early life and education
Yamyam was born in the city of Dhuusa Mareeb, Galgadud Region. Yamyam's mother was Canoof Ibraahim. He was the youngest child of 6 and the only son to his mother as his other siblings had a different mother.

Yamyam started attending Madrasa at age four and he finished studying the Quran by age eight. He attended the Somali School of Natural Sciences. He moved to the north-west of the country to pursue further education and graduated from Mogadishu University, producing his first work when he was 18 years old.

He was Muslim, following the predominant religion in Somalia.

Career
He is famous both for his extensive study on peat bogs in the East Africa region and for his many poems and plays.

New Playwrights with New Somali Orthography
With the new Somali alphabet or orthography in 1972, Yamyam  became member of a minority Somali poets who pen down his works as opposed to poets producing volumes of poems in the traditional Somali oral literature.

Yamyam was recognized as an influential Somali poet and playwright whose creative output did not wane following the state's collapse and subsequent civil war which continued for a decade and a half. He lived in Mogadishu and continued to write poems and articles for Somali websites and newsletters on the misfortunes befallen on Somalia which was one of Africa's strongest countries during post-colonial era.

Awards

First Poetry Competition in Hargaisa
Yamyam was the recipient of the first academic style Somali Poetry Competition held in Hargaisa in 1972.
On Somali National Patriotic Programme Series, a 12 part series which aired in June 2013, Aamin Media Limited, placed Yamyam at Episode #8, right next to Abdullahi Suldan Tima Ade, another great Somali poet. The program profiles 12 great patriots and military persons who lived from mid 1400 to contemporary Somali heroes.

Yamyam, as most other gifted entertainers, used his poetic talents to highlight the misfortunes that befell on his fellow Somalis as the result of the civil war and the ensuing chaos. He had a sense of humour that attracted both the young and old across Somali society.

Suldan Tima Cade's patriotic poems throughout the 1950 to 1970s were extended by Yamyam who continued the patriot legacy with new interpretations of social and politics aspects in Somali life and adding his footprints on Somali Literature from the early 1970s until his death in 2005.

Moving to Mogadishu
After winning first of its kind poetry competition in Hargeisa in 1972, Yamyam moved to Mogadishu, the capital of Somalia. He immediately found a job at the newly created National Folklore, Arts, Culture, Literature, which had such important cultural centers such as Somali National Theatre.

At his tenure at SNAC center in Mogadishu, he wrote many poems, plays and other literary pieces. He worked for several government ministries and contributed to on air radio programs such as Radio Mogadishu and Radio Hargaisa and higher learning institutions, primarily, Somali National University at Gaheyr and Lafoole.

Poetry and Public Services
Some of his more famous poems are Gabay ammaan ah (A poem of praise), Kowda Maajo: Hambalyo 1975 (The First of May: Congratulations 1975), "Hees" (A hees poem), and Ma riyaa ma run baa (Is it a dream? Is it reality?). Two of his poems appeared in the magazines Sahan (Reconnaissance)  and Horseed (Vanguard), although most of them still reached the public in oral form. Cali often wrote on social topics. One of his poems, for instance, was a commentary on the political situation of the Somali people in the late 1950s, and another, written in 1962, was a protest against the import of foreign cars when the mass of the people were still living in poverty.

Researcher and Contributor at SNAC
Yamyam was engaged in the Somali National folklore and poetry circles for nearly four decades. At the height of the Somali Military Revolution, Yamyam wrote poems directly accusing the government of attempting to create new social programs while much needed social programs lay in abandonment. One such poem was ' Digo rogasho' which he wrote in October 1984.
In the early 1970s he went to the capital, Mogadishu, where he joined Waaberi (literally Dawn), a troupe of singers, dancers and playwrights. His genius at writing lyrics and poems was soon recognized by his contemporaries and his songs were performed on Radio Mogadishu.

Influencing Somali Society and Politics
Abdulkadir Yamyam co-authored with Ahmed Farah Ali Idaajaa for a popular play (primarily in verse) called Dabkuu Shiday Darwiishkii (The Fire that the Dervish Lit) about the anti-colonial resistance waged by the Somali Dervishes under the leadership of Sayid Mohamed Abdulle Hassan from 1900 to 1920.

Farah Idaja wrote, that, Yamyam's play, about Somali Dervishes, Fire that the Dervish Lit, "Dabdkuu Shiday Darwiishkii" where the play's first scene depicts imagined scenes from European powers' conference in Barlin during 1884-1885 Africa colonial divisions.  Although, Yamyam was a patriot, he often reflected European colonial past wrongdoings from 1884 Africa divisions to the 1894 "Tripartite Accord" from Britain, Italy and Ethiopia.

His poetry reflected radicalism and dislike for the misuse of power and misappropriation of public funds of the toppled regime in Somalia in the 1970s and 1980s. Mind you, Yamyam was only four uncles removed to President Siad Barre and he was not easy on him- this came to light when later during the civil war he remained in Mogadishu despite his closeness to the overthrown president.

Civil War Years and Arta Peace Conference
Before he moved this August to the US to rejoin his family, who had settled there after the civil war in Somalia, Yam Yam (variant spelling) lived in Mogadishu. Unfazed by the lawlessness. Throughout the 1990s, at the height of the two-decade long Somali civil war, he did not align himself with any of the tribal factions in Somalia. He felt a moral obligation to promote peace in his troubled country.

At the Somalia National Peace Conference held in 2000, YamYam described the national of Somalia as "in ruins" and said he no longer celebrated national holidays.

Yamyam is survived by his wife, four sons and two daughters. Rage, the eldest son of Yamyam is ın his own right a poet. He was one of the main entertainers of the 2007 annual Somali Community gathering honoring youngsters who achieve great academic success.
Unlike most Somali poets, Yamyam penned down all his literary work starting from early on before he won the first academically conducted poetry competition held in Hargaisa.

"I am Somali"

In print material, the poet's name has varying spellings for his nickname, Yamyam or Yam Yam. Many people believe Yamyam was a long ago deceased poet at the time of Hooyaaleey style Somali poetry during the mid eighteenth century at time of Raage Ugaas and others because of in-depth content which he is unique for in his field as a great poet coupled with the academic work which he penned down, for example, his first play co-authoring with Ahmed Farah Ali 'Idaja', using the newly created Somali orthography.

Ordinarily, Somali poets produce volumes of oral literature full of tribal feud but Yam Yam was an academic type, thus he refrained from using poetry and plays to "side with any of opposing sides" although he remained in Mogadishu throughout the 1990s when Mogadishu was the epicenter of the Somali civil war. In 2001, Yam Yam moved to Nairobi, Kenya to settling in Nairobi.

While contributing to volumes of poems and dozens of plays for a span of nearly forty years, Yamyam is credited with numerous contributions and collaborations during the height of the civil war in Somalia from 1991 to his death in Columbus Ohio in 2005. Yamyam was greatly appreciated at his appearances at the year-long Somali National Peace Conference better known as Arta Peace Conference, held in Arta, Djibouti.

Yamyam grew up in Hargaisa but he remained in Mogadishu for much of his working life including a decade and a half, a period when the Somali civil war years were at climax. When it came to show his patriotism, Yamyam gave hours of poetry entertainment and a dose of reality for the year-long Arta Somali Peace Conference.

During the Arta Peace Conference, on the occasion of June 26 Northern Somalia Independence Day, He reminded every Somali that, he no longer celebrated independence days as Somalia "lay in ruins", since the choas and lawlessness in the capital Mogadishu.

Later life
Abdulkadir Hersi Siyad, better known by his nickname Yamyam, died in a car accident in Columbus, Ohio, United States aged 60.

Works
The Fire that the Dervish Lit ("Dabkuu Shiday Darwiishkii ")
I am Somali (Soomali baan ahay)
 The First of May: Congratulations 1975 (Kowda Maajo: Hambalyo 1975)
Caku Geellu muu Dido!
A poem of praise (Gabay ammaan ah)
Is it a dream? Is it reality? (Ma riyaa ma run baa)
Oness of God (Tawxiid) 1984

References

1946 births
2005 deaths
Ethnic Somali people
Somalian dramatists and playwrights
Somalian poets
20th-century poets
20th-century dramatists and playwrights
Mogadishu University alumni
Harvard University alumni
Road incident deaths in Ohio
Somali-language writers
People from Dusmareb